Montréal–Saint-Henri was a former provincial electoral district in the Montreal region of Quebec, Canada that elected members to the Legislative Assembly of Quebec.

It was created for the 1923 election from most of the Montréal-Hochelaga electoral district, and parts of Jacques-Cartier and Westmount.  Its final election was in 1962.  It disappeared in the 1966 election and its successor electoral district was Saint-Henri. Part of the riding was redistributed into Sainte-Anne.

Members of the Legislative Assembly

References
 Election results (National Assembly)
 Election results (QuebecPolitique.com)

Former provincial electoral districts of Quebec